The Mayan community makes up 51% of the population of Guatemala. Although a few dozen cultural groups inhabited the area, they were considered one Mayan culture under the Spanish Empire. Under colonial Spanish rule, the Mayan people were forced to leave their homelands, work as slaves for the Spanish colonists, and convert to Christianity.

Although Spanish colonial rule in Guatemala ended in 1821, the oppression of the Mayan community did not. Following independence, the Ladino community took control of the social, economic, and political hierarchies within Guatemala. Throughout the seventeenth century, the Ladino population forced the indigenous communities to be forms of slaves or cheap labor, give up their lands, and assimilate into Guatemalan society.

While there was social relief for the Mayan community in the mid-eighteenth century, this was ended by the 1954 U.S-backed military coup that directly led to the Guatemalan Civil War, which is now widely considered a genocide carried out by the Guatemalan government against the Mayan population.

Although the Civil War ended with the 1996 Peace Accords, Mayan oppression within Guatemala still continues through the economic, social, and political disparities the indigenous peoples face. While the Pan-Mayan movement has attempted to establish equality for the Mayan people, there is still debate over the amount of success the movement has achieved.

Historical oppression

Colonial Oppression 
Until their conquest by the Spanish Empire, the indigenous Mayan identity was not unified, but separated amongst different indigenous groups such as the Kaqchikel, the Mam, the K'iche, and the Tz'utujil. Using pre-existing conflicts, namely over territory, the Spanish used the divide and conquered tactic in order to achieve military victory over the indigenous peoples.

Shortly after the Spanish conquest of Guatemala in 1524 brought by Pedro de Alvarado, the Spanish began to use the indigenous people as a labor force to construct the pueblos de indios. The Spanish forcibly relocated the indigenous people to the pueblos and put them under the control and administration of the Spanish Empire. The Spanish Empire allocated parceled lands to each community of peoples in order to provide subsistence and pay tribute to the empire in the form of taxes, cacao, maze and other agricultural products grown in the pueblos. The Empire also forced the communities to supply "reparto" where 1/3 of the indigenous male populations from each community were made to work on Spanish plantations and haciendas. This male workforce would rotate with other male residents every 9 months.

While under the Spanish Empire, Mayans still garnered their own traditions, culture and religion. Nevertheless, the presence of the colonial rule interrupted many aspects of indigenous life. One of the disruptions came from the Spanish induced social hierarchy  which ranked citizens based on a racial caste system. The white citizens, or the blanks, held the highest status. The lowest status was held by the Mayans, or los Indios, and the black citizens and slaves, or los negros. However, in relation to los negros, los Indios was even lower on the totem pole. It was customary to remind the indigenous people of this by using black men as a whipping post. This furthered the horror the indigenous people felt towards the Spanish Empire using the idea that the black man was holding the Mayans down. One's status was determined by the purity of their blood line. People of mixed descent soon came to have the status of castas. Those of mixed indigenous and European descent were not subject to all of the harsh realities that purely indigenous people were.

Another type of disruption came from religious tensions. With the introduction of the Spanish Empire also came the imposition of Christian doctrine on the Mayan communities. Christianity was taught in the pueblos, yet not greatly accepted until near the end of colonial rule in Guatemala. This was, in part, due to the oppression indigenous people faced at the hands of the church and local administrations. By the 1550s, indigenous communities began to write to the Spanish Empire to petition for relief from the harsh Spanish administration. These petitions would usually address high-ranking Spaniards and report on the struggles that the indigenous communities faced under the empire. However, when authority figured from both the church and local government found out about the petition written, they would threaten the Mayans with skinning and burning them alive in order to force a retraction of the petition. This who wrote the petition would usually flee from the pueblos to escape punishment. A Catholic priest who visited different pueblos to report on the general acceptance of Christian doctrine amongst the indigenous population states that "While the Indians ratify the petition, the priest threaten them, the mayors imprison and beat them, everyone tells them they'll be treated worse later and...the priest and the mayors end up vindicated.

Under the rule of Alvarado, an estimated 5 million Mayan lives were lost due to many reasons such as slaughters, violence and injury, and, namely, disease (especially measles). In a letter from numerous Guatemalan Utatecan chiefs in Jocotenango, it was reported how the children were being abused, kidnapped and sold into slavery. Alongside this, the indigenous populations suffered greatly, were beaten, and asked to pay so much in tribute to the crown that they were left impoverished. The macehules were forced into slave labor and the ones who were imprisoned were sold to Spanish households as more free labor.

The 1800s saw the ascension of the Bourbon Dynasty to the Spanish throne and the descension of Spanish colonial rule in Central America. With an increasing number of revolts across all of Central American and Northern Mexico, the Spanish Empire attempted to strengthen its rule by becoming even stricter with regards to controlling every aspect of colonial life. Nevertheless, as regional commerce increased and, alongside it, the wealth of Creole elites, the Spanish colonial holdings grew weaker and weaker. The Creole population also increased their aggression towards the Mayan population. The elites began extracting more labor, revenue and land from the Mayans. In response to the increase aggression from the colonial elites, Mayan likewise increase their aggression in rebelling against colonial rule. A series of at least 50 major indigenous riots occurred from 1710 to the year of Guatemalan independence from colonial rule, 1821. These revolts were influences by the Mexican Revolution in 1819, led by Miguel Hildago, as well as the French Revolution and the Haitian Revolution.

One of the largest uprisings was the Totonicapan Uprising of 1820 led by Atanasio Tzul and Lucas Aguilar. The indigenous people held off the colonial troops for almost half a year. After hearing that the Constitution of 1812 set to be reinstated in 1816, which would bring back forced indigenous labor and tribute payments to the Spanish crown, the K'iche people in Santa Maria Chiquimula and other neighboring cities took a stand and scared off and colonial authorities who demanded tribute payment. From April to June 1820, the rebels consolidated in San Miguel and publicly declares control over the town. On August 3, 1820, the rebellion was brought to an end when the Spanish army charged the town with little to no opposition from the indigenous rebels. The Spanish army captured and imprisoned the movement's leaders. This revolt was reinforced indigenous power and autonomy at the local level.

Post-colonial oppression 
The end of colonial authority in Guatemala did not equate to the end of oppression for the Mayan people. Immediately following independence was two decades of political conflict between the Liberals and the Conservatives of Guatemalan society. The Liberal, made up of middle-class urban and provincial elites, pushed for modernization and wanted to limit the power of the church. The Conservatives, who were the old colonial merchant class and government aristocracy, aimed to garner colonial hierarchies and protect the power of the church. Many Liberal reforms weakened Mayan autonomy, as they aimed to privatize lands held by Mayan communities. By 1837, the countryside revolt led by Rafeal Carerre, brought a neocolonial Catholic rule. The authority of the church was Brough back and indigenous autonomy was decreased even more.

Forced labor returned with the emergence of the Planter class in the 1860s. This era saw the increase in coffee production. The increased demand for coffee resulted in the increased demand for land and labor, and, thus, increased oppression of indigenous populations. The Liberal Revolution of 1871 consisted of a series of laws passed by the Guatemalan government that intruded on the autonomy of Mayan communities and brought indigenous back forced labor. In Decree 177, Mayans had to draft labor from their communities. Laborers were sent 60 at a time to coffee plantations to work in 15-30 day increments. Many different laws were passed at the benefit of the plantation owners to help them to control the indigenous laborers and increase their landholdings and profits. These laws saw a deepened divide between the Mayan and Landino communities.

The idea of "Landinozation" also emerged in the 1860s. This was the idea that Mayans could become Landios by giving up aspects of their identity that made them Mayan. Although later condemned as "cultural genocide", this notion of Mayan assimilation into Guatemalan society was believed to be good for both the mayan community and the nation's health overall.

Much remained the same throughout the end of the seventeenth century. The main focus of the landing was the Landing was to maintain control over the Mayan. As a long-lasting effect of colonialism, many in Guatemalan society believed that the Mayans were the inferior population and didn't have the ability to assimilate to the white culture of the government. The industrial revolution weakened ties even further between the Mayan communities and Guatemalan government. The Liberals pushed for the building of a railroad and other North American commodities which would, in turn, decrease the autonomy and amount of land that the Mayans had. The Liberals increasingly blames the mayans for the lack of economic growth in Guatemala due to their tendency to choose to abide by tradition ways of life. Over the course of the twentieth century, tensions only furthered as Mayans became viewed with more and more negativity. Moreover, with the introduction of international corporations, such as the United Fruit Company, indigenous people, most of whom were impoverished, became a major part of the exploited work force.

The "Guatemalan Democratic Spring" of the 1940s saw the greatest hope for change for the Mayan peoples. With the rise to power of President Juan Jose Arevalo came the introduction of the rights of the peasants. The first national policy of land reform came in the early 1940s. The goal of this reform was to help peasants improve their economic status through the implementation of minimum wage laws and some land redistribution. Arevalo's predecessor, President Jacobo Arbenz, was elected in 1951. He pushed for even more radical change, such as the Congressional decree 900 in 1952. This decree redistributed unused land.

While the Mayan and peasant population supported Arbenz's policies, the elites and foreign companies did not. The United Fruit Company pressured the United States government to get rid of Arbenz. In response, the United States Central Intelligence Agency supported a Guatemalan coup in 1954 that removed Arbenz from power. Arbenz was replaced by a military regime under Carlos Castillos Armas. This coup resulted in 36 years of violence between the military-installed regime and guerrilla movements known as the Guatemalan Civil War.

Guatemalan Civil War 

The Guatemalan Civil War lasted from 1960 until 1996. After the coup of 1954, political activism amongst indigenous and peasant communities became more radical. The first of the guerrilla forces emerged in the 1960s. The introduction of guerrilla forced led to an increase in governmental repression. There began to be "political disappearances" of guerrilla members and their supported. By the end of the 1970s, open civil war was waged in Guatemala.

The 1960s and 1970s also saw the introduction of the "Liberation Theology." This ideology used biblical principals to support solidarity with poor communities, the critique of capitalism and local development projects. Many young Mayans joined this ideology.

The government induced violence of the civil war took place in stages. Until 1981, the killings were selective. The government mainly focused on guerrilla and Mayan political leaders. However, in 1981 and the election of Efrain Rios Montt came the Scorched Earth Policy. This form of counter insurgency was indiscriminate between guerrilla forces and Mayan citizens. During what was known as the "Victory '82" campaign, the Guatemalan military committed over 600 massacres, with some killing as many as 300-400 Mayans, and displaced millions of Mayan citizens. Victory '82 was followed by "Firmness '83" and "Renewal '84," which were campaigns that sought the militarized reconstruction of the Mayan highland regions.

The Guatemalan government was not the only part committing acts of violence. Mayans saw threats from both sides of the civil war, the geurillas and the government. By 1981, the government regime targeted all Mayans as subversives, namely because of their history of struggle against the government and their general support of Arbenz's policies (which were widely viewed as communist policies). If Mayan communities decided to support the army, the community was targeted by guerrillas and vice versa.

The Guatemalan Civil was brought to an end by the 1996 Peace Accords. The civil war directly led to the genocide of an estimated 200,000 Mayans and the displacement of many more. The Guatemalan Historical Clarification Commission (CEH) stated that about 93% of the human rights violations of the civil war were carried out by the state. Three percent were committed by the guerrilla forces and 4% of the human rights violations were carried out by other, non identified actors.

Mayans made up 83% of the civil war's victims. Most of the victims were concentrated in the Guatemalan northern and north-western highlands where there was a majority Mayan population.

1996 Peace Accords 
The 1996 Peace Accords, signed on December 12, 1996, by the Guatemalan government and guerrilla rebels, formally ended the Guatemalan Civil War. During the time of the Peace Accords and the decade immediately after, 1996 - 2006, there was an increase in global support for indigenous rights. The Mayans were represented by COPMAGUA.

The Peace Accords were made up of 3 accords. The first was the "Commission for Historical Clarification Accord." This accord establish a commission of three people to clarify and report on the human rights violations of the civil war. The commission was made up of three actors: the present Moderator of the peace negotiations who was appointed the United Nation's Secretary General. A citizen of Guatemala chosen by the Moderator and an academic chosen by the Moderator from a list proposed by university presidents.

The second accord was the "Indigenous Rights Accord." This accord focused on recognizing the importance of the Mayan identity to Guatemala. This accord also realize Mayan discrimination and worked to make racial discrimination illegal. Alongside this, the accord worked to increase the rights of the Mayan people as well as the inclusion of Mayan culture and political ideals in Guatemalan society.

The final accord was the "Socio-Economic Accord." This accord worked to increase civic participation in governmental affairs at all levels, but mainly the municipal level. This accord also worked to outline future prospects for economic goals through rural developments and new fiscal policies.

Modern oppression

Mayan oppression from 1996 to present 
While the 1996 Peace Accords ended decades of armed conflict in Guatemala, it did not bring a complete end to oppression for the Mayan peoples. Although the Peace Accords stressed increased participation of the Mayan peoples in governmental processes, according to researcher Nicholas Copeland, Mayans have still been less inclined to participate in progressive movements than their other indigenous counterparts throughout Latin America. Those that do participate in these progressive movements, even with the help of NGOs and INGOs, face threats of state and parastate violence. However, a report by Global Americans in 2017 argued that this lack of political representation for indigenous people in Guatemala is mainly due to internal strife, stating that "tensions between and within the left in Guatemala (which exist to this day) are undoubtedly responsible for the UNRG’s lack of electoral success." Only 19 Mayans were reported to have served in Guatemala's Congress during the 2016-2020 legislative term.

Furthermore, there are social disparities that remain in Guatemalan society as of 2008. A study conducted in 2014 regarding the wealth gap within Guatemala reported that 75% of the indigenous population of Guatemala is still poor, with 30% living in extreme poverty. Alongside this, there has been an increase in criminal violence and lynching in Mayan communities as of 2007. While some argue that this increase in lynching is die to indigenous customary law, others believe that the lynchings have been brought about by a lack of trust in the police and justice systems within Guatemala. This has led to a wave of immigration of Mayan youth from Guatemala to the United States.

The Pan-Mayan Movement 
Although oppression still continues, some Mayans have found support from the Pan-Mayan Movement. The Pan-Mayan Movement is motivated by Pan-Mayanism. Other names for the movement include the "Maya Movement," "Mayan Revitalization Movement" and "Movimiento Maya'' (as the indigenous peoples call it). The Pan Mayan Movement is said to represent the "organized Mayan," which is one of the reasons that the movement faces backlash from the Mayan community. This movement was one of the leading organizations representing the Mayan community during the peace accords.

The Pan-Mayan movement has three groups of leaders: the elders, the second generation, and the third generation. The elders were born before the Civil War and received educations that consisted of their indigenous ethnic consciousness. The Second generation was born at the beginning of the Guatemalan Civil War and were in charge during the peace accords. The third generation was born during the arguably most brutal years of the civil war (the 70s to 80s). Each group has different agendas for the Pan Mayan movement, which has led to disunification within the movement. Kyrie Anne Kowalick argues that, for these reasons, the Pan-Mayan movement has been unsuccessful in creating economic and political stability for the Mayan peoples.

Another question that has risen from the Pan-Mayan movement is whether the movement should focus on growing the Mayan identity or the Mayan popularity. Those that support growth of the Mayan identity support the strengthening of the Mayan culture. Those who support the growth of the Mayan popularity focus on political questions that are more than expressions of the Mayan ethnicity. Because of this disagreement in how the movement should be led as a whole, some Mayans choose to solely act within their own communities.

References 

Maya peoples of Guatemala
Discrimination in Latin America
Anti-indigenous racism in South America